The white-throated tinamou (Tinamus guttatus) is a species of bird native to the Amazon rainforest of Brazil, northern Bolivia, southeastern Colombia, northeastern Ecuador, eastern Peru and southern Venezuela.

Etymology

The scientific name for the white-throated tinamou, Tinamus guttatus, originates from two different languages. Tinamus was the name given to the tinamou by the Kalina people. Guttatus means "speckled" in Latin. This may be in reference to the yellowish-white spots on a white-throated tinamou's lower back.

Taxonomy
All tinamous are from the family Tinamidae and members of the infraclass Palaeognathae. Tinamous are the only members from their infraclass that aren't ratites, and can even fly, albeit poorly. All paleognaths evolved from prehistoric flying birds, and tinamous are the closest living relative of these birds. The white-throated tinamou is a member of the genus Tinamus, which consists of some of the larger tinamous, the white-throated tinamou being the smallest member of the genus. It was first described by Austrian ornithologist August von Pelzeln in 1863. It is a monotypic species, meaning it doesn't branch off into subspecies.

Description
The white-throated tinamou has chestnut-brown upperparts with blackish streaking on lower back and small yellowish-white spots. It has paler underparts with wider, dark barring on flanks. It has a grey head and neck, with a white throat, brown eye, and brown bill.

Behavior
Like other tinamous, the white-throated tinamou eats fruit off the ground or low-lying bushes, as well as invertebrates, flower buds, tender leaves, seeds, and roots. The male incubates the eggs which may come from as many as four different females, and then will raise them until they are ready to be on their own, usually two to three weeks. The nest is located on the ground in dense brush or between raised root buttresses.

Range and habitat
They eat seeds, fruits and invertebrates.

Conservation
It is a relatively abundant species in its habitat and the main threat to it is deforestation. Its eggs are prized possessions to some collectors.

Footnotes

References 
 
 
 
 
 

Tinamous of South America
Birds of Bolivia
Birds of Brazil
Birds of Colombia
Birds of Ecuador
Birds of Peru
Birds of Venezuela
Tinamus
Birds described in 1863
Taxa named by August von Pelzeln